Limnaecia ida is a moth of the family Cosmopterigidae. It is known from Australia.

References

Limnaecia
Moths described in 1908
Moths of Australia